The Waspair HM 81 Tomcat is a British canard ultralight aircraft of unusual design, that was produced by Waspair and later Midwest Microlites. The designer is disputed and Chip Erwin, Larry Whiting and Robin Haynes are all named as designers. The aircraft was supplied as a kit for amateur construction.

Design and development
It features a high-wing supported by dihedral stabilizers, a single-seat, open cockpit, tricycle landing gear and a single engine in pusher configuration.

The aircraft structure is made from aluminum tubing. Its  span wing sits high above the pilot's seat, providing pendulum stability. The controls are very unconventional and all are canard mounted, which has two surfaces. The canard surfaces move in unison to produce pitch and separately, in opposite directions, to produce roll. The large fixed dihedral stabilizers provide yaw control as the wing has no dihedral of its own for yaw coupling. The canard surfaces are mounted to the front of the main keel tube, which serves as a fuselage. The pilot is accommodated on an open seat bolted to the same tube. The Cuyuna 430 powerplant is located behind the pilot.

In service the control system has proved inadequate and the aircraft is difficult to control in flight, particularly in air that is not smooth and there have been a number of loss-of-control accidents. The Virtual Ultralight Museum describes the aircraft as "ungainly and unstable". Reviewer Andre Cliche says of the Tomcat's handling characteristics:

Cliche recommends that Tomcats be scrapped for parts and not flown.

An improved model, the Pintail, was later introduced by Haynes, which has control surfaces on the trailing edge of the dihedral stabilizers, but it is unclear if this fully addresses the original design's deficiencies.

Variants
Tomcat Standard
Initial version with two-axis controls
Tomcat Sport
Improved version with two-axis controls
Tomcat Tourer
Two seat model with two-axis controls
 Haynes Pintail
Improved version with three-axis controls

Specifications (Pintail)

References

External links
Image of the Tomcat
Tomcat in flight

1980s United States ultralight aircraft
Homebuilt aircraft
Single-engined pusher aircraft